Upbeat in Music is a 1943 short film produced as part of The March of Time series distributed theatrically by 20th Century Fox. The film has significant history as being early film appearances of Frank Sinatra and Perry Como. The film also features footage of Glenn Miller in uniform as a captain in the United States Army Air Forces leading the U.S. Army Training Command Band.

The March of Time series

Episodes in the series were issued every four weeks. The documentary was produced by the editors of Time. Upbeat in Music was Issue No. 5, Volume 10 in the series. 20th Century Fox released lobby cards to promote the documentary.

20th Century Fox described the Upbeat in Music episode from 1943 as follows: "'Upbeat in Music'. Music for victory ... symphony or jazz. Elman or Ellington, Koussevitzky, Como, Gershwin, Goodman, Glenn Miller, Bea Wain and many others ... your favorite artists are seen giving their talents to build morale in a star-studded story of music at war."

HBO Archives presented a synopsis of the documentary: "Upbeat in Music – (Volume 10, Episode 5) – December 1943 SYNOPSIS: Music for military, brief Glenn Miller in uniform, V-discs, 'Hip Kits', many big names playing, singing, composing. Runs 16:53."

References

Sources
 Yanow, Scott. Jazz on Film. 2004. "There is a very brief glimpse of Glenn Miller's Army Air Force Band ('St. Louis Blues March')." https://books.google.com/books?id=8FwyY-6IveQC&pg=PA240...

External links
 

1943 short films
The March of Time films
20th Century Fox short films
American black-and-white films
American short documentary films
1943 documentary films
1940s American films